The 15013 / 15014 Ranikhet Express is a Mail/Express train of Indian Railways. This train is a mail/express that falls under the North Eastern Railway zone of Indian railways. The train code is 05013/14.

The total travel time of this train is 28 hours and 20 mins. It has about 36 halts and covers a distance of over 1263 km at a speed of 42 km/hr. This train runs of all days of the week and arrives at platform no. 11 at the Jaisalmer station.
During COVID-19 pandemic in India, this train had changed from 15013/14 to new:- 05013/14.

Route and halts
It crosses the states of Rajasthan, Haryana, Delhi, Uttar Pradesh & Uttarakhand.

Service

The 15013 / 15014 Ranikhet Express covers the distance of 1256 kilometres in 28 hours and 05 min. It runs daily from both the side. Inaugural run was on 15 Jan 2013.

No RSA – Rake sharing, Total 3 rakes.

As the average speed of the train is below 45 km/hr, as per Indian Railway rules, its fare does not include a Superfast surcharge.

Traction
This train hauls by an Izzatnagar-based WDP-4D diesel locomotive from end to end.

Coach composition

The train has Utkrisht ICF rakes with max speed of 110 kmph.

 1 AC I Tier 
 2 AC II Tier
 3 AC III Tier
 1 AC II Tire + AC III (Hybrid)
 9 Sleeper coaches
 5 General
 3 Second-class Luggage/parcel van

Note : – Coach S, AB, and B and 1GENand GRD Splits at Moradabad railway station. Coaches and marked in green colour

Direction reversal

Schedule

See also

 Kathgodam railway station
 Jaisalmer railway station
 Jaisalmer City
 Kathgodam City

References

External links 
 Indian Rail Info
 Indian Railways

Transport in Jaisalmer
Transport in Haldwani-Kathgodam
Named passenger trains of India
Rail transport in Uttarakhand
Rail transport in Uttar Pradesh
Rail transport in Delhi
Rail transport in Haryana
Rail transport in Rajasthan
Express trains in India